Samarahan may refer to:
Samarahan Division, one of the twelve administrative divisions of Sarawak, Malaysia.
Samarahan District, one of the three administrative districts within the Samarahan Division.
Samarahan (federal constituency), a defunct federal constituency in Sarawak, Malaysia.

See also
Kota Samarahan (disambiguation)